A Prince Edward Island New Democratic Party leadership convention was held on April 7, 2018, as a result of the resignation of Michael Redmond on December 6, 2017, after he placed fourth place in the Charlottetown-Parkdale by-election held on November 27, 2017.

Joe Byrne was elected party leader on the first ballot.

Declared candidates
Margaret Andrade, former NDP candidate in Leeds—Grenville—Thousand Islands and Rideau Lakes, Ontario during the 2015 federal election and former municipal councillor in Alberta.
Joe Byrne, former NDP candidate in Charlottetown during the 2015 federal election
Susan MacVittie, managing editor of an environmental magazine and former outreach organizer and scheduler for Courtenay-Alberni NDP MP Gord Johns in British Columbia.

Results 
Joe Byrne – 123
Margaret Andrade – 
Susan MacVittie
Total votes cast – 215

See also
New Democratic Party of Prince Edward Island leadership elections
2022 New Democratic Party of Prince Edward Island leadership election

References

External links

New Democratic
Prince Edward Island
New Democratic

New Democratic Party of Prince Edward Island leadership election